This is a list of defunct airlines of Honduras.

See also
List of airlines of Honduras

References

Honduras